This is a list of seasons played by Danish football club Brøndby IF from 1982, when Brøndby IF entered the top-flight Danish football championship, to the present day. It details the club's achievements in major competitions, in both Danish football and European tournaments.

Key

Seasons
{|class="wikitable"
|-bgcolor="#efefef"
!rowspan="2"|Season
!colspan="3"|League
!rowspan="2"|Danish Cup
!rowspan="2"|Europe
!rowspan="2"|Others
|-
! Pos. !! Competition !! Top scorer
|-
|1981-82
|align=right |4||1982 1st Division||Michael Laudrup (15)
|4th round
|
|
|-
|1982-83
|align=right |4||1983 1st Division||Brian Chrøis (12)
|4th round
|
|
|-
|1983-84
|align=right |4||1984 1st Division||Jens Kolding (11)
|3rd round
|
|
|-
|1984-85
|align=right bgcolor=gold|1||1985 1st Division||Claus Nielsen (17)
|3rd round
|
|
|-
|1985-86
|align=right bgcolor=silver|2||1986 1st Division||Claus Nielsen (16)
|Quarter-final
|
|
|-
|1986-87
|align=right bgcolor=gold|1||1987 1st Division||Claus Nielsen (20)
|4th round
|EC1 quarter-final
|
|-
|1987-88
|align=right bgcolor=gold|1||1988 1st Division||Bent Christensen (21)
|bgcolor=silver|Finalist
|EC3 2nd round
|
|-
|1988-89
|align=right bgcolor=silver|2||1989 1st Division||Bent Christensen (10)
|bgcolor=gold|Winner
|EC1 1st round
|
|-
|1989-90
|align=right bgcolor=gold|1||1990 1st Division||Bent Christensen (17)
|Quarter-final
|EC1 1st round
|
|-
|1990-91
|align=right bgcolor=gold|1||1991 Superliga||Bent Christensen (11)
|Semi-final
|EC3 semi-final
|
|-
|1991-92
|align=right |7||1991-92 Superliga||Kim Vilfort (9)
|4th round
|EC1 2nd round
|
|-
|1992-93
|align=right bgcolor=cc9966|3||1992-93 Superliga||Kim Vilfort (10)
|5th round
|
|
|-
|1993-94
|align=right bgcolor=cc9966|3||1993-94 Superliga||Mark Strudal (13)
|bgcolor=gold|Winner
|EC3 3rd round
|
|-
|1994-95
|align=right bgcolor=silver|2||1994-95 Superliga||Mark Strudal (12)
|Quarter-final
|EC2 2nd round
|Danish Supercup winner
|-
|1995-96
|align=right bgcolor=gold|1||1995-96 Superliga||Peter Møller (15)
|bgcolor=silver|Finalist
|EC3 3rd round
|
|-
|1996-97
|align=right bgcolor=gold|1||1996-97 Superliga||Peter Møller (22)
|Semi-final
|EC1 qualification roundEC3 quarter-final
|Danish Supercup winner
|-
|1997-98
|align=right bgcolor=gold|1||1997-98 Superliga||Ebbe Sand (28)
|bgcolor=gold|Winner
|EC1 qual 2nd roundEC3 1st round
|Danish Supercup winner
|-
|1998-99
|align=right bgcolor=silver|2||1998-99 Superliga||Ebbe Sand (19)
|Semi-final
|EC1 group stage
|
|-
|1999-00
|align=right bgcolor=silver|2||1999-00 Superliga||Bent Christensen (13)
|Semi-final
|EC1 qual 3rd roundEC3 1st round
|
|-
|2000-01
|align=right bgcolor=silver|2||2000-01 Superliga||Peter Graulund (21)
|Quarter-final
|EC1 qual 3rd roundEC3 1st round
|
|-
|2001-02
|align=right bgcolor=gold|1||2001-02 Superliga||Peter Madsen (22)
|5th round
|EC3 3rd round
|
|-
|2002-03
|align=right bgcolor=silver|2||2002-03 Superliga||Mattias Jonson (11)
|bgcolor=gold|Winner
|EC1 qual 3rd roundEC3 1st round
|Danish Supercup winner
|-
|2003-04
|align=right bgcolor=silver|2||2003-04 Superliga||Thomas Kahlenberg (11)
|Semi-final
|EC3 3rd round
|
|-
|2004-05
|align=right bgcolor=gold|1||2004-05 Superliga||Thomas Kahlenberg (13)
|bgcolor=gold|Winner
|EC3 qual 2nd round
|Royal League group stage
|-
|2005-06
|align=right bgcolor=silver|2||2005-06 Superliga||Johan Elmander (13)
|Semi-final
|EC1 qual 3rd roundEC3 group stage
|Royal League group stageDanish League Cup winner
|-
|2006-07
|align=right|6
|2006-07 Superliga
|Morten Rasmussen (15)
|4th round
|EC3 1st round
|Royal League winnerDanish League Cup winner
|-
|2007-08
|align=right|8
|2007-08 Superliga
|Morten Rasmussen (7)Martin Ericsson (7)
|bgcolor=gold|Winner
|
|-
|2008-09
|align=right bgcolor=cc9966|3
|2008-09 Superliga
|Morten Rasmussen (9)Alexander Farnerud (9)Ousman Jallow (9)
|Semi-final
|EC3 1st round
|
|-
|2009-10
|align=right bgcolor=cc9966|3
|2009-10 Superliga
|Morten Rasmussen (12)
|4th round
||EC3 qual play-off round
|
|-
|2010-11
|align=right bgcolor=cc9966|3
|2010-11 Superliga
|Michael Krohn-Dehli (11)
|
|-
|2011-12
|align=right|9
|2011-12 Superliga
|Simon Makienok Christoffersen (10)
|
|}

Sources
Brøndby IF season results
Brøndby IF match calendar 1995-present
Haslund.info
HvemVandt.dk

Seasons
 
Brondby